The 2015 Mid-American Conference men's soccer tournament was the 22nd edition of the tournament. It determined the Mid-American Conference's automatic berth into the 2015 NCAA Division I Men's Soccer Championship.

The Akron Zips won the tournament, besting the Buffalo Bulls in the championship match. It was Akron's fourth-consecutive MAC championship, and their 12th ever MAC title.

Qualification 

The top four teams in the Mid-American Conference based on their conference regular season records qualified for the tournament.  Akron, Buffalo, Western Michigan and West Virginia earned berths into the tournament.

Bracket

Schedule

Semifinals

MAC Championship

Statistical leaders

Top goalscorers

Tournament Best XI

See also 
 Mid-American Conference Men's Soccer Tournament
 2015 Mid-American Conference men's soccer season
 2015 NCAA Division I men's soccer season
 2015 NCAA Division I Men's Soccer Championship

References 

tournament 2015
Cincinnati Bearcats Ohio